The 1952 NCAA Swimming and Diving Championships were contested in March 1952 at the pool at Dillon Gymnasium at Princeton University in Princeton, New Jersey at the 16th annual NCAA-sanctioned swim meet to determine the team and individual national champions of men's collegiate swimming and diving in the United States. 

Ohio State once again returned to the top of the team standings, earning the Buckeyes their seventh national title.

Team standings
Note: Top 10 only
(H) = Hosts
Full results

See also
List of college swimming and diving teams

References

NCAA Division I Men's Swimming and Diving Championships
NCAA Swimming And Diving Championships
NCAA Swimming And Diving Championships
NCAA Swimming And Diving Championships